Miles Thompson (1808-1868) was an English architect from Kendal, then in Westmorland.

He was employed by Francis and George Webster as a draughtsman from about 1825, was taken into partnership in 1845, and took over the business when George retired in 1846.

Selected works

Life and legacy

He did not marry, and died in Kendal on 26 August 1868. In his will he left several properties in and around Kendal to his three brothers Robert, Marcellus and John and various nieces and nephews.

A statuette of Thompson was placed by his brother Robert on top of the gable of number 21 Beast Banks in Kendal. After it deteriorated, a replacement was erected by the Kendal Civic Society.

John Close, writing in 1862, celebrates Thompson in one of a group of biographical poems entitled "Nature's Nobility". The first verse, of seven, is:

The Kendal public wash-house building in Allhallows Lane which he designed is now a Wetherspoons pub named "The Miles Thompson" in his memory, having served as offices for South Lakeland District Council in between.

References

1808 births
1868 deaths
Architects from Cumbria
People from Kendal